Cochlostoma pageti is a species of small land snail with an operculum, a terrestrial gastropod mollusc in the family Cochlostomatidae.

Geographic distribution 
C. pageti is endemic to Greece, where it occurs in the region of Epirus in the north-western part of the country.

References

Diplommatinidae
Molluscs of Europe
Endemic fauna of Greece